Hajnalka Futaki (born 9 June 1990 in Gyula) is a former Hungarian handball goalkeeper.

Achievements
Magyar Kupa:
Silver Medalist: 2012
Bronze Medalist: 2010

External links
 Hajnalka Futaki player profile on Békéscsabai Előre NKSE Official Website
 Hajnalka Futaki career statistics at Worldhandball

References

1990 births
Living people
People from Gyula
Hungarian female handball players
Békéscsabai Előre NKSE players
Sportspeople from Békés County